Michael Olivo (born December 7, 1988) is an American cartoonist and designer, currently residing in Rutherford, New Jersey.

Publication

References 

1988 births
Living people
American cartoonists
People from Rutherford, New Jersey